Minto Heights is a suburb of Sydney, in the state of New South Wales, Australia 50 kilometres south-west of the Sydney central business district, in the local government area of the City of Campbelltown. It is part of the Macarthur region.

History
The Tharawal people were the original inhabitants of the region. The open space of the  blocks hints at the farming history of the area while the larger homes being built the suburb point to a more recent change in land use.

The bushland began to be cleared in the late 19th century to be replaced by orchards and other small farms. Until then, the area was known as East Minto and, like its neighbour, was named after the Earl of Minto, Gilbert Elliot-Murray-Kynynmound, who was Viceroy of India from 1807 to 1814. In 1973, Campbelltown Council proposed changing the name to Warby, which was rejected by locals who insisted it be called East Minto. This, in turn, was rejected by the Geographical Names Board of New South Wales, which had a policy against "East" and other compass points being added to suburb names. Eastminto, Myrtlefield, Hansen and Kyngmount were also rejected by one side or the other until consensus was reached with Minto Heights in 1976.

References

External links
  [CC-By-SA]
  [CC-By-SA]

Suburbs of Sydney
City of Campbelltown (New South Wales)